Man lā Yaḥḍuruhu al-Faqīh ( with Him) is a Hadith collection by the famous Twelver Shia Hadith scholar Abu Jaʿfar Muḥammad ibn ʿAli ibn Babawayh al-Qummi, commonly known as Ibn Babawayh or Sheikh al-Saduq (lit. The Truthful Scholar). This work is included among the Four Books of Twelver Shia Islam.

Name
The book has also been translated as "Every man is his own lawyer".

Compilation
In his introduction to the book the author explains the circumstances of its composition and the reason for its title. When he was at Ilaq near Balkh, he met Sharif al-Din Abu 'Abd Allah known as Ni'mah. He brought a book compiled by Muhammad b. Zakharia al-Razi entitled Man la yahduruhu al-Tabeeb or Every man his own doctor to the attention of Shaikh al-Saduq. He, then, asked him to compile a book on Fiqh (Islamic Jurisprudence), The Halal and the Haram (the permitted and prohibited) and al-shara-i' wa-'l-ahkam (revealed law and ordinary laws) which would draw on all the works which the Shaikh earlier had composed on the subject. This book would be called Man la yahduruh al-faqih and would function as a work of reference.

Contents
Man La Yahduruhu al-Faqih is mainly concerned with Furu al-Din. The book is meant to be a reference book to help ordinary Shia Muslims in the practise of the legal requirements of Islam. Generally, the Isnad's (list of the narrators) is absent. Thus, the book is a summary of the study of legal traditions. Shaikh al-Saduq himself said about his work: 
I compiled the book without Isnads so that the chains (of authority) should not be too many (-and make the book too long-) and so that the book's advantages might be abundant. I did not have the usual intention of compilers (of books of traditions) to put forward everything which they (could) narrate but my intention was to put forward those things by which I gave legal opinions and which I judged to be correct

View
Shia Muslims regards this book as among the most reliable Hadith collections. Thus, the book is included in The Four Books of the Shia, together with Al-Kafi, Al-Istibsar and Tahdhib al-Ahkam. As with all Hadith collections, however, there is no guarantee of the authenticity of each individual hadith and the reliability of each must be separately assessed.

See also
List of Shia books
The Four Books
Al-Istibsar
Kitab al-Kafi
Tahdhib al-Ahkam

References

Shia hadith collections
Ja'fari jurisprudence